Hebesuncus is a genus of water bear or moss piglet, a tardigrade in the class Eutardigrada.

Species
 Hebesuncus conjungens (Thulin 1911)
 Hebesuncus ryani Dastych and Harris, 1994
 Hebesuncus schusteri (Dastych, 1984)
 Hebesuncus mollispinus (Pilato McInnes & Lisi 2012)

References

External links

Parachaela
Tardigrade genera
Polyextremophiles